Adams Grove Presbyterian Church is a historic Greek Revival-style church building in rural Dallas County, Alabama, near the community of Sardis.  Built in 1853, it features a distyle-in-antis type portico with box columns.  No longer actively used by a church congregation, the building is now privately owned.  It was placed on the National Register of Historic Places on June 5, 1986.

References

National Register of Historic Places in Dallas County, Alabama
Churches completed in 1853
19th-century Presbyterian church buildings in the United States
Greek Revival church buildings in Alabama
Churches on the National Register of Historic Places in Alabama
Presbyterian churches in Alabama